College Hermann Spethmann is a private college located in the city of Criciúma, state of Santa Catarina, Brazil.

The college educates students with various learning needs, employing innovative teaching methods that do not require assessment by test. They have no sign of class beginning and ending. The founder of the institution, Roseli da Luz, explained that "evidence does not certify anything. The focus of the school is to teach and prepare students for the tests."

History

In 1988 the school was inaugurated as Pirlimpimpim, offering assistance in early childhood education. In 1998 the Centro Educacional Hermann Spethmann was founded, expanding from its initial class of grades 1–4. In 2003 it began to offer 5th to 8th grades. In 2005, it began to add high school classes.

Hermann Spethmann

He was born on January 1, 1888, in the city of Lübeck, Germany, and died in Brazil on June 23, 1953.

At the beginning of the 20th century, Germans settled in the north of the State of Santa Catarina. The state government offered assistance to immigrants in sectors such as education, health and social assistance.

To encourage the arrival of skilled immigrants, the Government prepared an intensive program to recruit from German universities.

After two years of active service in academic medicine, Hermann Spethmann accepted the challenge and signed a contract with the State to offer health education to immigrants.

In 1911 he immigrated to Brazil by ship. On the journey, which took several days. he met Hana, who later became his wife and the mother of his children. His team was later broken up because of an epidemic that afflicted the entire Anitópolis region.

After several years, disgusted with the absence of support material, medicines and other commitments made in his contract, Spethmann decided to leave the project and open his own establishment in Joinville. After a few years of success, competition from pharmacy Bornschein (later Catarinense) ended the business. A school inspector friend proposed that he return to education. He accepted the challenge and specialized in Florianópolis.

He joined a private school in Arapongas in Indaial, located in a new colony. He stayed for sixteen years. It may have been the first private school in the state. The nationalization program of Getúlio Vargas banned the use of the German language in schools, causing Hermann Spethmann to leave teaching in 1939.

Spethmann is grandfather and great-grandfather of the founders of the college.

References

External links 

Official college website (in Portuguese)

Schools in Brazil